McElhatton is a surname. Notable people with the surname include:

Craig McElhatton, Irish rugby league player
Dave McElhatton (1928–2010), American television anchor
Heather McElhatton, American radio personality and writer
Michael McElhatton, Irish actor and writer
Michael McElhatton (footballer) (born 1975), Irish footballer